Gaston Lesturgeon (30 November 1936 – 28 July 2003) was a French judoka. He competed in the men's lightweight event at the 1964 Summer Olympics.

References

1936 births
2003 deaths
French male judoka
Olympic judoka of France
Judoka at the 1964 Summer Olympics
Place of birth missing